The Megamonster is a children's book written by David Walliams and illustrated by Tony Ross. It was released by HarperCollins on June 24, 2021. The story follows a girl called Larker discovering the secrets of her new school — the Cruel School.

Plot 
On a volcanic island, in the middle of shark-infested waters, stands The Cruel School. The lessons are appalling, the school dinners are revolting and the teachers are terrifying  especially the mysterious Science teacher Doctor Doktur.

When Larker is sent to the school, she quickly realizes something very odd is going on... something involving Doctor Doktur, a pair of strange spectacles, and a "Monsterfication Machine". And ultimately she finds herself face to face with a real life Megamonster.

There seems to be no escape – but for Larker, nothing is impossible...

References

2015 British novels
British children's novels
British novels adapted into films
HarperCollins books
Novels by David Walliams
Fiction set in 1983